HCHS may refer to:

Schools

U.S. 
Haines City High School, Florida
Halifax County High School, South Boston, Virginia
Hamilton County High School, Jasper, Florida
Hanover Central Junior-Senior High School, Cedar Lake, Indiana
Haralson County High School, Tallapoosa, Georgia
Harlan County High School, Rosspoint, Kentucky
Harnett Central High School, Angier, North Carolina
Hoke County High School, Raeford, North Carolina 
Harrison Central High School (Mississippi), Lyman, Mississippi
Harrison Central High School (Ohio), Cadiz, Ohio
Hart County High School, Hartwell, Georgia
Health Careers High School, San Antonio, Texas
Helix Charter High School, La Mesa, California 
Henderson City High School, Henderson, Kentucky
Henderson County High School, Kentucky
Henry Clay High School, Lexington, Kentucky
Hillwood Comprehensive High School, Nashville, Tennessee
Hinsdale Central High School, Hinsdale, Illinois
Holmes County High School, Bonifay, Florida
Holyoke Catholic High School, Chicopee, Massachusetts
Homer-Center Junior/Senior High School, Homer City, Pennsylvania
Houghton Central High School, Michigan
Houston County High School (disambiguation)
Hudson Catholic High School (Hudson, Massachusetts)
Humphreys County High School, Belzoni, Mississippi
Hunter College High School, New York City

Elsewhere
Han Chiang High School, Penang
Hanley Castle High School, Worcestershire, England
Harry Collinge High School, Hinton, Alberta
Heywood Community High School, Rochdale, England
Hsinchu Senior High School, Hsinchu City
Kaohsiung Municipal Hsin Chuang High School, Kaohsiung City

See also
 Holy Cross High School (disambiguation)